Then Again... is a compilation album of Colin James's greatest hits from 1995 and earlier released in 1995 (see 1995 in music).  Three songs were recorded for and first released on this album: "I Hope You're Happy", "Stay", and "Milk Cow Calf Blues".

Track listing 
 "Just Came Back"  – 4:56
 "I Hope You're Happy" – 4:36
 "Stay" – 4:40
 "Keep On Lovin' Me Baby"  – 3:40
 "Why'd You Lie"  – 5:25
 "Five Long Years"  – 4:36
 "Crazy Over You"  – 5:11
 "Down In The Bottom"  – 4:37
 "Cadillac Baby"  – 3:12
 "No More Doggin'"  – 3:09
 "Voodoo Thing"  – 3:38
 "Milk Cow Calf Blues" – 2:43

  originally released on Colin James
  originally released on Sudden Stop
  originally released on Colin James and the Little Big Band

External links 
 Then Again...

Colin James albums
1995 compilation albums
Albums produced by Terry Manning
Virgin Records compilation albums